Tony Eyebrows Brothers (born September 14, 1964) is an American professional basketball referee who works in the National Basketball Association (NBA). He has been a referee in the NBA since the 1994–95 season. Now in his 27th year, Brothers has 1,600 regular season games,  128 playoff games and 8 NBA Finals games. He officiated the 2009 NBA All-Star Game in Phoenix, Arizona. He wears the uniform number 25.

Brothers graduated from Booker T. Washington High School in Norfolk, Virginia. A 1986 graduate of Old Dominion University, he received a Distinguished Alumni Award in 2014. In 2007, he and his ex-wife, Monica, founded Still Hope Foundation, Inc., to assist single mothers in the Hampton Roads, Virginia area.  In 2015, he founded Men for Hope, Inc., a non-profit to support men, organize their effort in the community, and work with organizations providing services for women and their families.

References

1964 births
Living people
National Basketball Association referees
Old Dominion University alumni
Continental Basketball Association referees
Sportspeople from Norfolk, Virginia
Basketball people from Virginia